The men's three-cushion billiards singles tournament at the 2002 Asian Games in Busan took place from 5 October to 7 October at Dongju College Gymnasium.

The players were seeded based on their final ranking at the same event at the 1998 Asian Games in Bangkok. Hwang Deuk-hee of Korea won the gold after beating his compatriot Lee Sang-chun in the final.

Schedule
All times are Korea Standard Time (UTC+09:00)

Results

References 
2002 Asian Games Official Report, Page 292

External links 
 Official Website

Cue sports at the 2002 Asian Games